Llano de la Cruz is a corregimiento in Parita District, Herrera Province, Panama with a population of 318 as of 2010. Its population as of 1990 was 322; its population as of 2000 was 317.

References

Corregimientos of Herrera Province